Unity High School, also known as Mendon Unity, or UHS, is a public four-year high school located at 453 West Collins Street in Mendon, Illinois, a village in Adams County, Illinois, in the Midwestern United States. UHS serves the communities of Mendon, Fowler, Lima, Loraine, Marcelline, Meyer, and Ursa. The campus is located 15 miles northeast of Quincy, Illinois, and serves a mixed village and rural residential community.

History
Unity High School was formed in 1948 by the consolidation of four high schools: Lima High School, Ursa High School, Mendon High School and Loraine High School.

Athletics
Unity High School competes in the West Central Conference and is a member school in the Illinois High School Association. The UHS mascot is the Mustang, with school colors of maroon, white, and Columbia blue. Due to their small enrollment, they combine for football with Payson-Seymour High School.

References

External links
 
 Unity Community Unit School District 4

Public high schools in Illinois
Schools in Adams County, Illinois
1948 establishments in Illinois